Tiaan Falcon (born 19 June 1997) is a New Zealand rugby union player, who currently plays as a fly-half or fullback for Toyota Verblitz in the Japan Rugby League One competition.

Early life and career

Falcon was born in Penrith, where his father – former New Zealand Māori,  and  loose forward Gordon Falcon – played rugby league for the Penrith Panthers. With his family, he moved to New Zealand when he was two years old.

In Hawke's Bay, Falcon attended Lindisfarne College from 2011-2015. While there, he played for the school's 1st XV team. He also represented Hawke's Bay at under 14, under 16 and under 18 level.

In 2014 and 2015, Falcon was invited to attend the  U18 Camp. In his second year, he played for the Hurricanes U18 team in their annual game against the  U18 team.

On 19 September 2015, Falcon played for the New Zealand Barbarians Schools team in a match against New Zealand Schools.

Senior career

Following in the footsteps of his grandfather – former New Zealand Māori,  and  loose forward – Ray Falcon (40 games for Hawke's Bay, 1980-1983) and father Gordon Falcon (71 appearances for Hawke's Bay, 1989-1998), Tiaan became the third generation Falcon to play for the Hawke's Bay Magpies in 2016.

Falcon made his Hawke's Bay debut on 20 August 2016 – from the reserves bench – against . He got his first start for the Magpies, in the 12 jersey, on 7 September 2016 against  and scored his first try for the province against  on 19 August 2017.

Falcon played for the Hurricanes U20 team and Hurricanes senior team (during preseason) in 2017, before eventually signing a 2-year contract with the  ahead of the 2018 Super Rugby season, at the back of an outstanding performance for the New Zealand U20 team during the 2017 World Rugby Under 20 Championship.

Falcon made his first appearance for the Chiefs during the 2018 Brisbane Global Rugby Tens on 9 and 10 February 2018. Despite wearing Stevenson's 15 jersey, Falcon started the game at first five-eighth, with Damian McKenzie shifting to fullback.

He returned to play for  during the 2018 Mitre 10 Cup season, but suffered a season-ending shoulder injury during their round 5 game against  on 13 September 2018.

During the 2019 Super Rugby season, Falcon didn't fare any better on the injury front. He ruptured his Achilles tendon in January and had a major shoulder operation in April, that year. As a result, he didn't play a single game for the Chiefs that season. He made his return for Hawke's Bay against  on 3 October 2019 in round 9 of the 2019 Mitre 10 Cup. He also represented Hawke's Bay at the Central Regional Sevens tournament in Levin and the New Zealand National Rugby Sevens Tournament, later that year.

On 20 August 2020, the Chiefs announced that Falcon would be leaving the franchise to take up a 2-year contract with Japan Rugby League One club Toyota Verblitz. The Japanese club confirmed the signing on 5 October 2020. He would not play for  during the 2020 Mitre 10 Cup season.

Falcon made his debut for Toyota Verblitz on 13 March 2021 against Munakata Sanix Blues. He scored two tries and seven conversions – a total of 24 points – in his debut game. Unfortunately, he only played two games for the club, that season. The competition was cancelled after round 6 due to the COVID-19 pandemic.

On 5 June 2021, it was announced that Falcon had renegotiated a release from his Japanese contract to play for  during the 2021 Bunnings NPC season before returning to Japan – in September 2021 – to rejoin Toyota Verblitz for the 2022 Japan Rugby League One season. He played six games for the Magpies in 2021, including a thriller Ranfurly Shield defence against , in which he scored a penalty to tie the game at 33-33, before kicking the match-winning penalty in golden point extra time.

International career

In April 2017, Falcon was named in the New Zealand Under-20 squad for the 2017 Oceania Rugby Under 20 Championship, which that year consisted of tests against Australia, Fiji and Samoa. He played in all three games and New Zealand retained the Oceania title.

On 8 May 2017, Falcon was also named in the New Zealand Under-20 squad for the 2017 World Rugby Under 20 Championship in Georgia. He was a standout for New Zealand at the tournament, drawing worldwide attention with a brilliant behind-the-back pass to team mate Marino Mikaele-Tu'u, who put Caleb Clarke over for a try in the semi-final against France. Unfortunately, he suffered a concussion later in that game and was ruled out of the final against England. New Zealand won that final with a record score of 64 –17 and were crowned World Rugby U20 Champions for the sixth time. Falcon was the top scorer of the tournament with 69 points and was one of the players nominated for player of the tournament.

References

External links
itsrugby.co.uk profile

1997 births
Living people
Ngāti Porou people
Ngāti Kahungunu people
People educated at Lindisfarne College, New Zealand
New Zealand rugby union players
Rugby union players from Sydney
New Zealand Māori rugby union players
Rugby union fly-halves
Rugby union fullbacks
Hawke's Bay rugby union players
Chiefs (rugby union) players
Toyota Verblitz players